Baghil Union is a union parishad of Tangail Sadar Upazila, Tangail District, Bangladesh. It is situated 8 km northwest of Tangail, the district headquarters.

Demographics
According to Population Census 2011 performed by Bangladesh Bureau of Statistics, The total population of Baghil union is 30437. There are 6858 households in total.,

Bangladesh

Education
The literacy rate of Baghil Union is 41% (Male-45.7%, Female-36.5%).

See also
 Union Councils of Tangail District

References 

Populated places in Dhaka Division
Populated places in Tangail District
Unions of Tangail Sadar Upazila